Bonazzoli is an Italian surname. Notable people with the surname include:

Emiliano Bonazzoli (born 1979), Italian footballer
Federico Bonazzoli (born 1997), Italian footballer

See also
8742 Bonazzoli, a main-belt asteroid

Italian-language surnames